Swans Against the Sun is the fifth album by American singer-songwriter Michael Martin Murphey. The album features performances by John Denver, Charlie Daniels, and Willie Nelson, and peaked at number 44 on the Billboard 200.

Track listing
 "Swans Against the Sun" (Murphey) – 3:52
 "Renegade" (Murphey, Shaw) – 6:11
 "Rhythm of the Road" (Murphey) – 2:10
 "Pink Lady" (Murphey) – 4:56
 "Mansion on the Hill" (Fred Rose, Hank Williams) – 2:57
 "Dancing in the Meadow" (Murphey) – 3:28
 "Temple of the Sun" (Murphey) – 3:52
 "Buffalo Gun" (Murphey) – 3:19
 "Wild West Show" (Murphey) – 3:12
 "Natural Bridges" (Murphey) – 3:10
 "Seasons Change" (Clark, Lewis) – 4:15

Personnel
Music
 Michael Martin Murphey – vocals, guitar, mandolin, piano, banjo, harp, harmonica, autoharp, arranger
 John Denver – guitar, vocals
 Richard Dean – guitar
 Steve Weisberg – guitar
 John Goldthwaite – guitar
 Jerry Mills – mandolin
 Mickey Raphael – harmonica
 John McEuen – banjo, dobro, fiddle, slide guitar, violin, guitar
 Charlie Daniels – fiddle, guitar, violin, vocals
 Jac Murphy – harpsichord, piano, synthesizer, arranger
 James William Guercio – bass
 Michael McKinney – bass, vocals
 Harry Wilkinson – drums, percussion
 Earl Palmer – drums
 Tracy Nelson – vocals
 Jeff Hanna – vocals
 Willie Nelson – vocals

Production
 Bob Johnston – producer
 Tony Martell – executive producer
 Larry Cansler – arranger
 Jeff Guercio – engineer
 Vic Anesini – mastering
 Don Hummell – paintings
 Ron Coro – art direction

References

External links
 Michael Martin Murphey's Official Website

1976 albums
Michael Martin Murphey albums
Albums produced by Bob Johnston
Epic Records albums